Bolt is an Estonian mobility company that offers ride-hailing, micromobility rental, food and grocery delivery (via the Bolt Food app), and car-sharing services. The company is headquartered in Tallinn and operates in over 500 cities in more than 45 countries in Europe, Africa, Western Asia and Latin America. The company has more than 100 million customers globally  and more than 3 million partners use Bolt's platforms to offer rides and deliveries to customers.

History
Bolt (then Taxify) was founded in 2013 by Markus Villig, then a 19 year-old high-school student. Markus began working on the first iteration of Bolt after receiving a €5000 loan from his family. This allowed him to build the first prototype of the app while recruiting drivers personally on the streets of Tallinn. The service was launched in Tallinn, Estonia in August 2013 and by 2014 it was operating abroad.

In 2017, Bolt launched its services in London by acquiring a local taxi company with a licence to operate, but was forced by Transport for London to shut down its services. The company has filed a new licence application and relaunched in London in June 2019.

In September 2018, the company announced it was expanding into micromobility services (scooter and e-bike rental). After launching scooters in Paris, Bolt expanded its micromobility operations across Europe. 

As of February 2023, Bolt is the largest micromobility operator in Europe with operations in 260 cities across 25 countries in Europe and 245,000 shared vehicles available for rental.

In August 2019, the company rolled out its food delivery service, Bolt Food. Bolt Food launched in Tallinn, and has since expanded to over 80 cities across 20 countries with over 30,000 partners restaurants using the platform.

In September 2019, Bolt announced its "Green Plan", an initiative to reduce the ecological footprint of the transportation industry and Bolt as a company. The Green Plan goals include offsetting Bolt's contribution to the CO₂ emissions of the European transportation sector by at least 5 million tonnes by 2025 and adding more green vehicles for passengers to choose from.

In March 2019, and in 2020, Bolt was ranked third in the FT 1000: Europe's Fastest Growing Companies published by the Financial Times.

In May 2021, Bolt launched a car-sharing service, Bolt Drive. Bolt Drive launched in Tallinn, Estonia, and has since expanded to three more countries — Latvia, Lithuania, and France.

In September 2021, Bolt launched a rapid grocery delivery service, Bolt Market.

Financing 
Prior to announcing a strategic partnership with Didi Chuxing, Bolt had raised over €2 million in investment capital from Estonian and Finnish angel investors. In August 2017, Didi Chuxing invested an undisclosed amount believed to be an "eight-figure U.S. dollar sum". A May 2018 funding round with a $175 million investment from Daimler, Didi and others led to a 1 billion dollar valuation for the company, making it a unicorn.

In January 2020, the European Investment Bank (EIB) signed a EUR 50 million venture debt facility with Bolt. The financing, supported by the European Fund for Strategic Investments (EFSI), is to boost Bolt's product development in areas where technology can improve the safety, reliability and sustainability of its services. This includes investment in existing services such as vehicle for hire and food delivery, as well as the development of new products.

In December 2020, Bolt raised €150 million from venture capital funds. 

In March 2021, Bolt raised €20 million from IFC, a World Bank Group member, for further expansion in emerging markets. The company was valued at more than €2 billion after this fund raising round.

In August 2021, Bolt raised €600 million from Sequoia Capital increasing the valuation of the company to over €4 billion.

As of 2021, Didi Chuxing was no longer an investor in Bolt.

In January 2022, Bolt raised €628 million from investors led by Sequoia Capital and Fidelity Management and Research Co, taking the company's valuation to €7.4 billion.

Self-driving technology research
In August 2019, Bolt and the University of Tartu announced their partnership on an applied research project to develop self-driving technology for a Level 4 autonomous car. The joint-research programme set a goal for integrating autonomous vehicles (AVs) on Bolt's transportation app by 2026.

In April 2021, Bolt and the University of Tartu agreed to expand their cooperation on the AV project, signing a new 5-year agreement designed to further develop the technical capabilities of the university's autonomous driving lab in the areas of artificial intelligence and maps and algorithms to create better conditions for connecting technology to urban traffic infrastructures.

Support for Ukraine 
In late February 2022, following the Russian invasion of Ukraine, Bolt announced it was removing all products produced in Russia or associated with Russian companies from Bolt Market, as well as closing down all operations in Belarus due to the country’s enablement of the Russian invasion.

Bolt also announced it would donate 5% of every Bolt order in Europe in the two weeks following the invasion to support Ukraine. This amount to over €5 million which was distributed to NGOs working on the ground to support Ukraine and its people.

Bolt pledged to keep its services running in Ukraine during the ongoing Russo-Ukrainian War.

Criticism
Some drivers have issues with the company related to safety and remuneration; in early 2020 they staged a demonstration by blocking Bolt offices in South Africa.

References

External links
Bolt – Official Website

2013 establishments in Estonia
Ridesharing companies
Road transport in Estonia
Online companies of Estonia
Transport companies of Estonia
Transport companies established in 2013
Companies based in Tallinn
Estonian brands
Scooter sharing companies